The Dazey Products Company was a major American home appliance manufacturer that was founded in 1965. The company specialized in the manufacture of kitchen gadgets. It manufactured brand names such as "Seal-A-Meal" and "Food Saver".

The Rival Company purchased Dazey's product line in November 1996.

The remnants of Dazey Products Company was dissolved by 1999.

References

Further reading
 
 
 Hill, Judy (May 31, 1980). "Scrubber Needs More Than its Own Power." The Deseret News.

Patents
 

Manufacturing companies based in Kansas
Manufacturing companies established in 1965
Manufacturing companies disestablished in 1999
Helen of Troy Limited